Nicolò Stizzia (1542 – 17 February 1596) was a Roman Catholic prelate who served as Bishop of Cefalù (1594–1596).

Biography
Nicolò Stizzia was born in 1542 and ordained a priest in 1570. On 23 May 1594, he was appointed during the papacy of Pope Clement VIII as Bishop of Cefalù.
On 30 May 1594, he was consecrated bishop by Giulio Antonio Santorio, Cardinal-Priest of San Bartolomeo all'Isola with Flaminio Filonardi, Bishop of Aquino, and Leonard Abel, Titular Bishop of Sidon, serving as co-consecrators. 
He served as Bishop of Cefalù until his death on 17 February 1596.

References

External links and additional sources
 (for Chronology of Bishops) 
 (for Chronology of Bishops) 

16th-century Italian Roman Catholic bishops
Bishops appointed by Pope Clement VIII
1542 births
People from Paternò
1596 deaths
Religious leaders from the Province of Catania